David Frith was a footballer who played as full back for Blackpool, Tranmere Rovers and Fleetwood.

References

1929 births
2011 deaths
Footballers from Liverpool
Association football fullbacks
English footballers
Blackpool F.C. players
Tranmere Rovers F.C. players
Fleetwood Town F.C. players
English Football League players